Wildermieming is a municipality in the district of Innsbruck-Land in the Austrian state of Tyrol located 40 km west of Innsbruck and 4 km west of Telfs. The village was separated from Mieming which belongs to Imst (district) in 1833 and was incorporated into Innsbruck-Land in 1925.

Population

References

External links

Cities and towns in Innsbruck-Land District
Mieming Range